Paulette Adassa Hamilton (born ) is a British Labour politician who has been the Member of Parliament (MP) for Birmingham Erdington since 2022. She is the first black MP to represent a constituency in Birmingham. Hamilton was also a councillor on the Birmingham City Council between 2004 and 2022, representing the Handsworth Wood and later Holyhead ward.

Early life and career
Hamilton was born and grew up in Handsworth, West Midlands. Her parents emigrated to England from Jamaica in the 1960s as economic migrants and worked in factories. She has six siblings, and attended Wilkes Green Infant and Junior School (now William Murdoch Primary School). Hamilton reports that she experienced discrimination at her primary school, including teachers commenting that children like her were only destined "to have babies", as well as questioning whether she could read. She later attended King Edward VI Handsworth Wood Girls' Academy, where she was inspired by her mathematics teacher, Mr. Potter, who supported her in gaining seven O Levels.

Hamilton worked as a nurse in the NHS for 25 years, including as a district nurse, sister, and later as a regional development officer for the trade union Royal College of Nursing.

Political career
Hamilton was elected as a councillor on Birmingham City Council, representing Handsworth Wood between 2004 and 2018, and Holyhead between 2018 and 2022. She was the Cabinet Member for Health and Social Care on the council from 2015 to 2022.

She was selected as the Labour candidate for the 2022 Birmingham Erdington by-election on 26 January 2022. The by-election was called after the death of Labour MP Jack Dromey, who had represented the constituency since the 2010 general election. The constituency is considered a notionally safe Labour seat as it has been represented by a member of the party since its recreation in 1974. The day before the by-election, GB News published footage from a 2015 panel discussion about increasing political representation of ethnic minorities called "The Ballot or the Bullet – Does your vote count?", which Hamilton attended. This event was named after the speech of the same name by American human rights activist Malcolm X. In the footage, Hamilton commented "I'm not sure we will get what we really deserve in this country using the vote". In response to the footage, two Conservative MPs called for her suspension. The Labour Party responded that "her comments had been misrepresented and taken out of context...". Hamilton reported that she had received "horrendous" online abuse due to the publication of the footage.

Hamilton was elected as MP in the by-election on 3 March 2022 with a majority of 3,266 (19.2%) on a turnout of 27.0%. She was Birmingham's first black MP. Hamilton has been a member of the Health and Social Care Select Committee since July 2022.

Personal life
Hamilton is married to a milliner, Dennis, who runs a shop in Grand Central, Birmingham. They have five children, one step-child and six grandchildren.

References

External links
 

1960s births
21st-century English women politicians
21st-century English politicians
Black British MPs
Black British women politicians
British women nurses
Councillors in Birmingham, West Midlands
English people of Jamaican descent
Female members of the Parliament of the United Kingdom for English constituencies
Labour Party (UK) MPs for English constituencies
Labour Party (UK) councillors
Living people
UK MPs 2019–present